Francis Cephas "Frank" Platt (born January 23, 1866 in Painted Post, Steuben County, New York – died May 31, 1952) was an American politician from New York.

Life
He was the son of Cephas F. Platt (died 1883) and Mary E. Platt. He attended the public schools, and then became a farmer. On January 7, 1895, he married Jennie Faulkner, and they had two sons. He was Supervisor of the Town of Erwin from 1896 to 1899.

Platt was a Republican member of the New York State Assembly (Steuben Co., 1st D.) in 1900, 1901, 1902, 1903, 1904 and 1905.

He was a member of the New York State Senate (43rd D.) from 1909 to 1912, sitting in the 132nd, 133rd, 134th and 135th New York State Legislatures.

In 1922, Platt ran for the Republican nomination for Congress, proposing to hold a popular referendum on the question of prohibition of alcohol. and in 1930, Platt ran for the Republican nomination for sheriff of Steuben County. In 1936, Platt made another bid for a seat in the state assembly.

Platt married Jane Faulkner, with whom he had two sons, Gerald and Chester.

References

Sources
 Official New York from Cleveland to Hughes by Charles Elliott Fitch (Hurd Publishing Co., New York and Buffalo, 1911, Vol. IV; pg. 343f, 346, 348f, 351 and 367)
 The New York Red Book by Edgar L. Murlin (1903; pg. 169f)

1866 births
Year of death missing
Republican Party New York (state) state senators
People from Painted Post, New York
Republican Party members of the New York State Assembly
Town supervisors in New York (state)